Coolderry is a small roadside village in southern County Offaly, Ireland. It is located 8 kilometres north of Roscrea and 11 kilometres south of Birr. The village lies close to the Slieve Bloom Mountains. Places of note include Gloster House and Leap Castle.

Amenities
Coolderry contains a number of facilities including a Roman Catholic church, Coolderry National School, a community hall and a GAA facility.

Demographics
In the 2006 Census, the electoral division of Ettagh, in which Coolderry is located, had a population of 433. Coolderry village itself has a population of around 80.

Sport
Coolderry is home to Coolderry GAA, the most successful hurling side in Offaly with 31 Offaly Senior Hurling Championship titles and 1 Leinster Senior Hurling Championship title.

References

Towns and villages in County Offaly